Ignacio de la Llave y Segura Zevallos (26 August 1818 – 23 June 1863) was a general and the governor of the Mexican state of Veracruz (1861–1862).

Life
He was born in Orizaba, Veracruz, a nephew of the prominent politician Pablo de la Llave. He participated in the Mexican–American War, in the 1851 revolution against Antonio López de Santa Anna, in the Reform War (against the conservatives), and (on the nationalist side) against the usurper Maximilian of Mexico. He died as a result of battle injuries sustained in 1863 in the aftermath of the Siege of Puebla.

Honors
There is a municipality of Ignacio de la Llave in the state of Veracruz, named after him. In 1932, it was renamed from San Cristóbal de la Llave.

Also, the state of Veracruz was known as Veracruz-Llave from 1863 to 2004, and since 2004, it has been officially known as Veracruz de Ignacio de la Llave.

References

Governors of Veracruz
Mexican military personnel of the Mexican–American War
1818 births
1863 deaths
People from Orizaba
Politicians from Veracruz
Mexican generals
Liberalism in Mexico
Second French intervention in Mexico